The Skills for Business network is an umbrella organisation for the twenty-five Sector Skills Councils in the United Kingdom.

History
The whole set of SSCs are funded by the UK Commission for Employment and Skills.

Sector Skills Councils
 Skills CFA - business skills
 People 1st - hospitality, leisure, travel and tourism www.people1st.co.uk
 Skills for Care and Development
 Skillsmart Retail
 Skillset - creative industry
 GoSkills
 Construction Skills
 The Institute of the Motor Industry (formerly Automotive Skills)
 SEMTA
 Financial Services Skills Council
 Creative & Cultural Skills - advertising
 Skills for Justice
 Cogent - chemicals and pharmaceuticals
 Skills for Health
 Lifelong Learning UK
 e-skills UK - IT industry
 Skillfast-UK - fashion - closed 31 March 2010 and merged with Skillset
 Energy and Utility Skills
 Lantra - environment and rural
 Improve Ltd - food and drink manufacturing
 SkillsActive - sport
 Proskills UK
 SummitSkills - building services engineering (air conditioning and refrigeration, electrotechnical, heating and ventilating, and plumbing) www.summitskills.org.uk
 Asset Skills - property management
 Skills for Logistics
 Government Skills - central government

External links
 Skills for Business

Sector Skills Councils
Department for Business, Innovation and Skills